Assemblage (from , "a collection of things which have been gathered together or assembled") is posthumanist philosophical approach that studies the ontological diversity of agency, which means redistributing the capacity to act from an individual to a socio-material network of people, things, and narratives. Also known as assemblage theory or assemblage thinking, this philosophical approach frames social complexity through fluidity, exchangeability, and their connectivity. Its central thesis is that people  do not act exclusively by themselves, and instead human action requires complex socio-material interdependencies.

There are multiple philosophical approaches that use an assemblage perspective. One version is associated with Manuel DeLanda in work on assemblage theory. A second version is associated to the work of Bruno Latour and Michel Callon on Actor-network theory. A third version draws from  Gilles Deleuze and Félix Guattari.  The similarities among these versions include a relational view of social reality in which human action results from shifting interdependencies between material, narrative, social, and geographic elements. The theories have in common an account for emergent qualities that result from associations between human and non-humans. In other words, an assemblage approach asserts that, within a body, the relationships of component parts are not stable and fixed; rather, they can be displaced and replaced within and among other bodies, thus approaching systems through relations of exteriority.

Overview
The term assemblage, in a philosophical sense, originally stems from the French word agencement, whose meaning translates narrowly to English as "arrangement", "fitting, or "fixing". Agencement asserts the inherent implication of the connection between specific concepts and that the arrangement of those concepts is what provides sense or meaning. Assemblage, on the other hand, can be more accurately described as the integration and connection of these concepts and that it is both the connections and the arrangements of those connections that provide context for assigned meanings.

John Phillips argued in 2006 that Deleuze and Guattari rarely used the term assemblage at all in a philosophical sense, and that through narrow, literal English translations, the terms became misleadingly perceived as analogous. The translation of agencement as assemblage that "give[s] rise to the connotations based on analogical impressions, which liberate elements of a vocabulary from the arguments that once helped form it."

Deleuze and Guattari 
In A Thousand Plateaus: Capitalism and Schizophrenia, Deleuze and Guattari draw from dynamical systems theory, which explores the way material systems self-organize, and extend the theory to include social, linguistic, and philosophical systems in order to create assemblage theory. In assemblage theory, assemblages (or relationships) are formed through the processes of coding, stratification, and territorialization. Any one philosophical context never operates in isolation. 

An assemblage is a constellation of singularities, stratified into the symbolic law, polis, or era. A constellation, like any assemblage, is made up of imaginative contingent articulations among myriad heterogeneous elements. This process of ordering matter around a body is called coding. According to Deleuze and Guattari, assemblages are coded by taking a particular form; they select, compose, and complete a territory. In composing a territory, there exists the creation of hierarchical bodies in the process of stratification. Drawing from the constellation metaphor, Deleuze and Guattari argue that the constellation includes some heavenly bodies but leaves out others; the included bodies being those in close proximity given the particular gathering and angle of view. The example constellation thus defines the relationships with the bodies in and around it, and therefore demonstrates the social complexity of assemblage.

Territorialization is another process of assemblage theory, and is viewed as the ordering of the bodies that create the "assemblage". Assemblages territorialize both forms of content and forms of expression. Forms of content, also known as material forms, include the assemblage of human and nonhuman bodies, actions, and reactions. Forms of expression include incorporeal enunciations, acts, and statements. Within this ordering of the bodies, assemblages do not remain static; they are further characterized by processes of deterritorialization and reterritorialization. Deterritorialization occurs when articulations are disarticulated and disconnected through components "exiting" the assemblage; once again exemplifying the idea that these forms do not and can not operate alone Reterritorialization describes the process by which new components "enter" and new articulations are forged, thus constituting a new assemblage. In this way, these axes of content/expressive and the processes of territorialization exist to demonstrate the complex nature of  assemblages.

The impact of Deleuze and Guattari is demonstrated by the fact that there is a journal from Edinburgh University devoted to their approach, Deleuze and Guattari Studies.

DeLanda 
Manuel DeLanda detailed the concept of assemblage in his book A New Philosophy of Society (2006) where, like Deleuze and Guattari, he suggests that social bodies on all scales are best analyzed through their individual components. Like Deleuze and Guattari, DeLanda’s approach examines relations of exteriority, in which assemblage components are self-subsistent and retain autonomy outside of the assemblage in which they exist  DeLanda details Deleuze and Guattari's (1987) assemblage theory of how assemblage components are organized through the two axes of material/expressive and territorializing/deterritorializing. DeLanda's additional contribution is to suggest that a third axis exists: of genetic/linguistic resources that also defines the interventions involved in the coding, decoding, and recoding of the assemblage. Like Deleuze and Guattari, DeLanda suggests that the social does not lose its reality, nor its materiality, through its complexity. In this way, assemblages are effective in their practicality; assemblages, though fluid, are nevertheless part of historically significant processes.

References 

Philosophical theories
Gilles Deleuze
Félix Guattari
Posthumanism